Marie Léopold-Lacour (née, Jourdan; also known as Mary Léopold Lacour; 6 January 1859 - 5 December 1942) was a French feminist activist, journalist, playwright, poet, and storyteller. She was a champion of mixed-gender schools. Lacour died in 1942.

Biography
Marie-Rachel Jourdan was born 6 January 1859, in Royan.
She contributed to feminist journals such as La Fronde, founded by Marguerite Durand. 

Wife of the feminist writer Léopold Lacour, she shared his passion for mixed-gender education. She spoke at the International Congress of Women of 1896, in Paris, chaired by Marie Bonnevial, describing the state of mixed-gender schools in Europe, and responding to the arguments of their opponents. 

In Literature (Harper and Brothers, 1898), Léopold-Lacour's name was included on a list of potential members if an Academy of Ladies was formed in Paris, several meetings already having been held to deliberate on the scheme. She participated in the planning committee of the "Condition et Droits" Congress, September 1900.

Mary Leopold-Lacour died 5 December 1942, in Neuilly-sur-Seine.

Selected works

Opera libretto
 Vlasta, opera libretto, with Mrs. Paul Poirson
 Sylvain et Gaël, comic opera libretto, with Mrs. Paul Poirson

Pantomime
 L'Héritage de Pierrot, pantomime in 2 acts, performed in Paris, at the Théâtre de l'Application (Les Escholiers), 20 May 1892
 Le Rendez-vous ou Plus fort que la mort, pantomime, (Les Escholiers), ca. 1895-1896
 Les Morts aimés, pantomime, (Les Escholiers) ca. 1895-1896
 Nuit d'hyménée !, pantomime, (Les Escholiers), ca. 1895-1896
 Don Juan aux enfers, ballet-pantomime in 1 act, music by Henri José, performed at the Casino de Paris, 29 November 1897
 La Chambre des aïeux, pantomime in 1 act, 10 scenes, published in Les Saisons, autumn 1921

Plays
 Un pauvre bûcheron, play in 1 act, published in La Pensée sur la Côte d'Azur, ca. 1923, and performed in Paris, at the Odéon-Théâtre de l'Europe, 20 December 1923

Sketches
 La Sérénade inutile, sketch published in La Pensée sur la Côte d'Azur, ca. 1929

Articles
 Mary Leopold Lacour, "Madame Gabrielle Réval", Femina, 1 October 1903, p. 685.

References

External links
 "RAPPORT DE MME MARY LÉOPOLD-LACOUR, RAPPORTEUR, PREMIÈRE PARTIE, Historique et Tableau de la Coeducation a l'etranger et en France.", CONGRES INTERNATIONAL DE LA CONDITION & DES DROITS DES FEMMES. Tenu les 5, 6, 7 et 8 Septembre 1900. A L'EXPOSITION UNIVERSELLE, Au Palais de l'Economie sociale et des Congrès. (in French)

1859 births
1942 deaths
19th-century French journalists
19th-century French dramatists and playwrights
19th-century French poets
20th-century French journalists
20th-century French dramatists and playwrights
20th-century French poets
French feminists
French activists
French storytellers
French women journalists
Women dramatists and playwrights
People from Royan
19th-century women journalists